The 1970 United States Senate election in Wisconsin was held on November 3, 1970. Incumbent Democrat William Proxmire was easily re-elected to a third term in office over Republican John E. Erickson, taking more than 70% of the vote, and defeating Erickson by more than 42 percentage points.

General election

Candidates
Elizabeth "Betty" Boardman (Independent)
John E. Erickson, general manager of the Milwaukee Bucks and former head coach of the Wisconsin Badgers men's basketball team (Republican)
Edmond G. Hou-Seye, businessman (American Independent)
William Proxmire, incumbent Senator (Democratic)
Martha M. Quinn (Socialist Workers)
Adolf Wiggert (Socialist Labor)

Results

See also
 1970 United States Senate elections

References

1970
Wisconsin
United States Senate